Grupo Desportivo Beira-Mar, usually called Beira-Mar de Monte Gordo is a Portuguese sports club from Monte Gordo.

The men's football team played in the Terceira Divisão from 2003 to 2011, except for a spell in the 2008–09 Segunda Divisão. The team also contested the Taça de Portugal during these years.

References

Football clubs in Portugal
Association football clubs established in 1950
1950 establishments in Portugal